Fascist architecture encompasses various stylistic trends in architecture developed by architects of fascist states, primarily in the early 20th century. Fascist architectural styles gained popularity in the late 1920s with the rise of modernism along with the ultranationalism associated with fascist governments in western Europe. Fascist styles often resemble that of ancient Rome, but can extend to modern aesthetics as well. Fascist-era buildings are frequently constructed with particular concern given to symmetry and simplicity.

Both Benito Mussolini and Adolf Hitler utilised new styles of architecture (variations of Rationalism, and Stripped Classicism respectively) as one of many attempts to unify the citizens of their states, mark a new era of nationalist culture, and exhibit the absolute rule of the state.

History
The fascist styles of architecture reflect the values of Fascism as a political ideology that developed in the early 20th century after World War I. The philosophy is defined by a strong nationalist people governed by a totalitarian government. The vision of a strong, unified, and economically stable nation seemed appealing to western Europe after the physical and economic destruction after World War I, which contributed to the rise of fascism and corporatism.

Italian and German fascism
Fascist architecture in the form of Rationalism became popular under Benito Mussolini's rule of Italy from 1922 to 1943. Within this period he transformed the Italian executive role from that of a prime minister to a dictatorship. A few years after his taking of office he was referred to as Il Duce (the leader). When Mussolini took office, he took on the role of bringing about fascism and idealism to replace democracy in Italy. He utilized all forms of media along with architectural identity. The new modernist style of architecture was one way to help build his vision of a unified fascist Italy. When Mussolini called for a fascist style of architecture, architects used the style to imitate that of imperial Rome and to bring historical pride and a sense of nationalism to the Italian people. Fascist architecture was one of many ways for Mussolini to invigorate a cultural rebirth in Italy and to mark a new era of Italian culture under fascism.

Similarly, once Hitler came to power in 1933 and transformed the German Chancellery to a dictatorship, he used fascist architecture in the form of Stripped Classicism as one of many tools to help unify and nationalize Germany under his rule. Hitler had plans to rebuild Berlin after the axis powers won World War II under the name Germania, or Welthauptstadt Germania. Hitler had his favorite architect, Albert Speer, design this new metropolis using fascist architecture design.

Style
Fascist-styles of architecture are a branch of modernist architecture which became popular in the early 20th century. The Italian Fascist style was also greatly influenced by the rationalist movement in Italy in the 1920s. Rationalist architecture, with the help of Italian government support, celebrated the new fascist age of culture and government in Italy.

In Nazi Germany, the extremely large and spacious Fascist architecture was one way envisioned by Hitler to unify Germany for what he described as "mass experiences", in which thousands of citizens could gather and take part in the patriotism of community events, and listen to speeches made by Hitler and other Nazi party leaders.

The fascist styles of architecture took design cues from Ancient Rome in that buildings of the styles were generally very large and symmetric with sharp non-rounded edges. The buildings purposefully conveyed a sense of awe and intimidation through their size, and were made of limestone and other durable stones in order to last the entirety of the fascist era and create impressive ruins. The buildings were also very plain, with little or no decoration, and lacked much complexity in design. These generalities of fascist architecture contributed to the simple aesthetics the edifices display. All these aspects helped the fascist dictatorships exhibit absolute and total rule of the population. Hitler and Mussolini used fascist architecture as another source of propaganda to display to the world the strength, pride and power their regimes had.

Architects
The most prominent Italian and German fascist architects of the era were:  
 Giuseppe Terragni – Notable work of Terragni includes the Casa del Fascio.
 Marcello Piacentini – Notable work of Piacentini includes the fascist district EUR, Rome.
 Albert Speer – Speer was Hitler's favorite German architect. He designed the Deutsches Stadion and had plans of rebuilding Berlin, using fascist style architecture, around a massive hall called the Volkshalle.

Structures
A few of the notable fascist architecture projects of the 20th century include 
 EUR, Rome (Esposizione Universale Roma) – Construction of the EUR began in 1936 in anticipation for Mussolini's World Fair in 1942 to mark the 20th anniversary of the Italian fascist era
 Palazzo della Civiltà Italiana – A famous edifice of the EUR
 Palazzo delle Poste, Palermo
 Palazzo di Giustizia, Milan
 Nazi party rally grounds
 Deutsches Stadion – the component of the Nazi party grounds Albert Speer designed and Hitler envisioned would host all the future Olympic games during the Third Reich

See also

Nazi architecture
Monumentalism
Novecento Italiano

References

 Fascismo - Architettura - Arte. Arte fascista web site